Innocent Eyes is the debut studio album by Australian singer Delta Goodrem, released in Australia on 24 March 2003. It was later released in the United Kingdom on 30 June 2003. Goodrem co-wrote most of the material, excluding "Throw It Away", "Lost Without You" and "Butterfly". The album features two self-penned songs, "In My Own Time" and "Will You Fall for Me". Goodrem worked with writers and producers such as: Audius Mtawarira, Bridget Benenate, Cathy Dennis, Eliot Kennedy, Gary Barlow, Jarrad Rogers, Kara DioGuardi, Vince Pizzinga and others to create the album with a collection of piano-based pop and ballad tracks.

Five singles were released from the album. Its lead single "Born to Try" was released in November 2002 and became a massive commercial success, peaking atop the ARIA Singles Chart and the New Zealand Singles Chart, becoming Goodrem's most successful single to date. Follow-up singles "Lost Without You", "Innocent Eyes", "Not Me, Not I" and "Predictable" also all reached number one on the ARIA Singles Chart. Goodrem became the first artist to have five number-one singles from a debut album. The first three singles charted within the top 10 in the United Kingdom. To promote the album, Goodrem embarked on The Visualise Tour.

Innocent Eyes debuted at number one on the Australian Albums Chart, making it her first number-one album. Altogether it sold 4.5 million copies worldwide including 1.2 million in Australia alone.
Innocent Eyes is the most successful album in Australia in 19 years. It was the highest-selling album in Australia of the decade and is the second-best-selling Australian album of all time.

Background
In September 2000, Goodrem signed to Sony Music and an album which she planned to release with independent label Empire Records was shelved. A year later, Goodrem released her debut single "I Don't Care" which peaked at number 64 on the ARIA Singles Chart.

Soon after, Goodrem began working on Innocent Eyes. She worked with a range of producers and songwriters, including the True North production and songwriting team: Gary Barlow, Eliot Kennedy (Spice Girls), Ric Wake (Celine Dion, Taylor Dayne, Jennifer Lopez, Mariah Carey), Kara DioGuardi (Kelly Clarkson, Christina Aguilera, Avril Lavigne, Hilary Duff), Matthew Gerrard (Mandy Moore, BBMak), Vince Pizzinga (Midnight Oil, Danielle Spencer), David Nicholas (INXS, Elton John, George) and Mark Holden.
Innocent Eyes is a Pop, pop rock and adult contemporary album which uses mostly live instruments.
Talking about the album, Goodrem said: "I wanted to make an album that reflected me at this time in my life", "Every song takes me to a place where I can remember what happened." She also said: "The album is almost like a diary I have been keeping over the last two years", "Every track has a meaning behind it that's personal to me. I have been looking forward to this day for a long time and I just hope that everyone likes the music as much as I loved making it."

Lawsuit
In 2004, Goodrem had been accused of owing thousands of dollars to songwriter Mark Holden. Holden wanted to clear up the terms of his contract with Goodrem and her record label Sony and requested all consultancy fees owed to him under the agreement.

Critical reception

Innocent Eyes received mostly positive reviews from music critics. Matthew Chisling from AllMusic described Goodrem's presence in the music industry as a "refreshing change". He also said that, "Innocent Eyes reflects a mature yet clean display of true vocal talent". Caroline Sullivan a writer for The Guardian said that "Goodrem sings her aspirational ballads with heartfelt candour, while her co-writer's credit on nearly every song seems to be more than affectation. The lyrics are a bit la-la-floating-on-clouds, but that doesn't dilute their charm".

Release and promotion

Singles
"Born to Try" was the first song from the album released in Australia on 11 November 2002, just a few days after Goodrem's eighteenth birthday. At the time of its release, Goodrem was performing the song on the Australian soap opera Neighbours, as singer Nina Tucker. The song debuted on the Australian Singles Chart on 18 November 2002 at number three. On its second week the song jumped to number two and was accredited platinum by ARIA, by its third week the song had knocked "The Ketchup Song" by Las Ketchup off the top spot and became Goodrem's first number-one single. The song eventually went on to certify triple platinum, becoming the fourth highest-selling single in Australia for 2003. It won three ARIA Awards for Breakthrough Artist – Single, Highest Selling Single and Single of the Year. "Born to Try" also went number-one in New Zealand and Slovenia, top ten in the UK, and top twenty in Ireland and the Netherlands.

"Lost Without You" was the second song released from the album. Released to radio on 14 February 2003, it became the most added song to radio for that week. It was released as a CD single on 3 March 2003 in Australia. The song gave Goodrem her second number one single in Australia on 10 March 2003 debuting at number one. The song eventually went on to certify double platinum, becoming the seventh highest selling single in Australia for 2003. It was nominated for one ARIA Award for Highest Selling Single but lost to herself with "Born to Try". "Lost Without You" also went top ten in New Zealand, Spain and the UK, and became the first of her four Number One singles in Sweden.

On 17 April 2003 it was announced that the third song released from the album was "Innocent Eyes" which was released as a CD single on 9 June 2003. The song debuted on Australian Singles Chart the charts at number two on 16 June 2003, behind "Bring Me to Life" by Evanescence, and was accredited gold. After three weeks in the charts it moved one spot up the charts and became Goodrem's third number-one hit single in Australia. The song went to certify platinum by ARIA, becoming the eighteenth highest selling single in Australia for 2003. It was nominated for one ARIA Award for Highest Selling Single but again lost to herself with Born to Try. "Innocent Eyes" also went top ten in the UK, top twenty in New Zealand and topped the chart in Israel.

"Not Me, Not I" was the fourth song released from the album in Australia on 15 September 2003. The song's music video was directed by Michael Spiccia and was filmed in August 2003. Goodrem was determined to film the music video and to have it completed before she started her second round of chemotherapy for Hodgkin's lymphoma because she said the song is her favourite from the album. The song made its debut on the Australian Singles Chart at number two behind Dido's "White Flag". Ond on its second week it went to number-one, making it Goodrem's fourth number-one single, breaking Kylie Minogue's record of having the most songs released from an album to reach number-one. The single also made history when it topped the chart in Malta, making Goodrem the first Australian artist to have a Number One record (either album or single) in that country.

"Predictable" was the fifth song released from the album and was released as a double A-side with her version of the John Lennon Christmas song "Happy Xmas (War Is Over)". It saw the release to radio on 25 November 2003 and topped the airplay charts, and when it saw its physical release, it became her fifth number-one single.

Tour

Goodrem launched The Visualise Tour in 2005 where she performed songs from Innocent Eyes and her second album Mistaken Identity. She performed 10 arena shows in Australian capital cities. The show on 24 July at Acer Arena in Sydney was filmed for inclusion on the live DVD for the concert tour entitled The Visualise Tour: Live in Concert, which was released on 13 November 2005. The DVD peaked at number one on the Australian ARIA DVD Chart and was certified four times platinum for sales of 60,000 units.

Commercial performance
Innocent Eyes debuted at number one on the Australian ARIA Albums Charts on 31 March 2003 with sales of over 70,000 copies, accrediting platinum and knocking Norah Jones's album Come Away with Me from the top spot. The album went on to spend twenty-nine weeks at number one. This broke John Farnham's record of twenty-five weeks at number one with Whispering Jack (1986). Innocent Eyes was then tied with Neil Diamond's album Hot August Night (1972) for spending the most weeks at number one in Australian history. Its accreditation reached to fourteen times platinum. The album became the highest selling album in Australia for 2003, spent eighty-seven weeks in the top one hundred, and won six ARIA Awards for Highest Selling Album, Best Female Artist, Breakthrough Artist – Album, Best Pop Release and Channel V's Oz Artist of the Year. In 2004 the album again won the award for Highest Selling Album. It went to sell over a million copies in Australia. In the UK, the album debuted on the charts at number two behind Beyoncé Knowles's album Dangerously in Love (2003). It spent thirty-one weeks in the top seventy-five, and became the eighteenth highest-selling album for 2003. Innocent Eyes is the second highest- selling album by an Australian female singer in the 2000s, behind Kylie Minogue's album Fever which sold over six million copies worldwide.

On 23 December 2003 it was announced that the one millionth copy of the album had been released to retail, the disc was specially marked by Sony and the buyer would receive a plaque commemorating the milestone. On 7 January 2010, Innocent Eyes was announced as Australia's top-selling album for the 2000s, for which Goodrem received a special award at the 2010 ARIA No. 1 Awards in Sydney on 22 July 2010.

Track listing

B-sides
The following tracks were not released on the album, but were released on the singles.

Personnel
Delta Goodrem — vocals, writer, producer, piano, keyboards, concept
Mark Russell – production coordination
Mark Fields – arranger, keyboards, producer, engineer, string arrangements, bass, guitar
Matthew Gerrard — arranger, programming, producer, instrumentation
Gary Barlow — keyboards, programming, producer
Eliot Kennedy — producer, guitar
Audius Mtawarira – co-writer, producer
David Nicholas – producer, vocal engineer
Rick Wake — producer
Daniel Denholm – conductor, string arrangements
Mike Ruekberg – guitar (baritone)
Steve MacKay – guitar
Mark Punch – guitar
Phil Solem — guitar
Craig Myers – guitar
Jeremy Meek – bass guitar
Chris Cameron – string arrangements
Vince Pizzinga – cello arrangement
Ameena Maria Khawaja— cello
Richard Sanford – piano
David Falzone – piano
Matt Mahaffey — keyboards, noise
Billy Hawn – percussion
Dorian Crozier — drums
Cathy Dennis — vocals (background)
Ami Richardson – vocals (background)
Bob Cadway – engineer
Chong Lim — vocal engineer
Jim Annunziatto – assistant engineer
Michael Brauer— mixing
Greg Calbi – mastering
Robbie Adams – assistant
Sam Story – assistant
Blair Simmons – assistant

Charts

Weekly charts

Year-end charts

Decade-end charts

Certifications

See also
List of best-selling albums in Australia

References

2003 debut albums
ARIA Award-winning albums
Delta Goodrem albums
Epic Records albums
Albums produced by Ric Wake
Sony Music Australia albums